Community March was a district-based political group formed in late 2017 in Hong Kong by a group of pro-democracy social activists.

History 
Initiated by former chairwoman of the Labour Party Suzanne Wu, the group was actively planning to field candidates in the 2019 District Council elections in Yau Tsim Mong and Sham Shui Po, after their unsuccessful first attempt in Tai Nan by-election. All 5 of its candidates were elected in the pro-democracy landslide victory, became the largest party in the Yau Tsim Mong District Council.

The group announced their disbandment on 8 September 2021.

Performance in elections

Yau Tsim Mong District Council elections

See also
 Democratic Coalition for DC Election
 Power for Democracy

References

External links
 

2017 establishments in Hong Kong
2021 disestablishments in Hong Kong
Political parties established in 2017
Political parties disestablished in 2021
Political organisations based in Hong Kong
Liberal parties in Hong Kong
Social democratic parties in Hong Kong